Damien Arsenault (born November 20, 1960) is a Canadian politician, who was elected to the National Assembly of Quebec in a by-election on December 5, 2011. He represented the electoral district of Bonaventure as a member of the Quebec Liberal Party caucus until September 2012.

Prior to his election to the legislature, Arsenault was the mayor of Saint-Elzéar.

External links

References 

Quebec Liberal Party MNAs
Living people
Mayors of places in Quebec
People from Gaspésie–Îles-de-la-Madeleine
21st-century Canadian politicians
1960 births